Lempäälän Kisa (LeKi) is an ice hockey team from Lempäälä, Finland. They currently compete in the Suomi-sarja. Their home rink is Masku Areena, which currently has a seating capacity of only 900 people.

Retired numbers
 5 Vesa Papinsaari
 8 Risto Mikkola
 17 Markku Joensuu
 19 Kari Virtanen

References

Mestis teams